Bloop was an ultra-low-frequency and extremely powerful underwater sound detected by the U.S. National Oceanic and Atmospheric Administration (NOAA) in 1997.

Bloop may also refer to:

 BlooP, programming language designed by Douglas Hofstadter
 Bloop curve, a type of baseball pitch, see glossary of baseball (B)#bloop curve
 Bloop (or blooper), a type of baseball hit, see glossary of baseball (B)#blooper
 Bloop tube, a nickname for the M79 grenade launcher
 "Bloop", the name of several fictional pet monkey characters, see pet monkey
 Bloop is the name of an Indian origin community powered OTT aggregator

See also 
 Blooper (disambiguation)